Schils is a surname. Notable people with the surname include: 

Gretchen Reydams-Schils (born 1965), American philosopher
Jozef Schils (1931–2007), Belgian cyclist
Mathias Schils (born 1993), Belgian footballer